Medicare is the publicly-funded universal health care insurance scheme in Australia, operated by the nation's social security department, Services Australia. Medicare is the principal way Australian citizens and permanent residents access most health care services in Australia.  The scheme either partially or fully cover the cost of most primary health care services in the public and private health care system. All Australian citizens and permanent residents have access to fully covered health care in public hospitals, funded by Medicare (through the National Health Pool), as well as state and federal contributions. International visitors from 11 countries have subsidised access to medically necessary treatment under reciprocal agreements.

Many specialties and allied health services are partially covered by Medicare, including psychology and psychiatry, ophthalmology, physiotherapy and audiology, with the exception of dental services. The list of services covered, the standard operating fee for the service, and the portion of that fee covered, is set out in the Medicare Benefits Schedule (MBS). Services not covered by Medicare may be partially supported by private health insurance, which the Australian Government subsidises for most Australians.

The scheme was created in 1975 by the Whitlam government under the name "Medibank". The Fraser government made significant changes to it from 1976, including its abolition in late 1981. The Hawke government reinstated universal health care in 1984 under the name "Medicare". Medibank continued to exist as a government-owned private health insurance provider until it was privatised by the Abbott government in 2014.

Constitutional framework

Australia's Medicare scheme operates under power granted to the federal Parliament by Section 51 of the Australian Constitution, enacted by the 1946 Australian referendum (Social Services). The referendum inserted into the Australian Constitution the ability for the Parliament of Australia to make laws for "the provision of maternity allowances, widows' pensions, child endowment, unemployment, pharmaceutical, sickness and hospital benefits, medical and dental services (but not so as to authorise any form of civil conscription), benefits to students and family allowances."

The amendment allows the Australian Government to fund health care services but does not allow the federal government to provide health care services directly. The operation of hospitals, for example, remains the responsibility of states and territories, through local Hospital and Health Services.

History

Health insurance prior to Medibank

From early in the European history of Australia, friendly societies provided most health insurance, which was widely adopted.

The states and territories operated hospitals, asylums and other institutions for sick and disabled people not long after their establishment, replicating the predominant model of treatment in the United Kingdom. These institutions were often large and residential. Many individuals and groups ran private hospitals, both for profit and not-for-profit. These were particularly active in providing maternity care.

The Commonwealth "Invalid and Old-Age Pensions Act 1908" provided an "Invalid Pension" to people "permanently incapacitated for work" and unable to be supported by their families, (so long as they fulfilled racial and other requirements). This provided money that recipients could spend on their care and assistance.

The federal government's Repatriation Pharmaceutical Benefits Scheme was established in 1919 for Australian servicemen and women who had served in the Boer War and World War I. This allowed them to have certain pharmaceuticals for free.

The 1925-6 Royal Commission on Health found that a national health insurance scheme should be established. Legislation to do so was tabled in parliament in 1928, 1938 and 1946, but did not pass each time. It was strongly opposed by the friendly societies and medical practitioners.

The Public Hospitals Act 1929 allowed public hospitals to set up their own insurance schemes. Many did.

From 1935 to the 1970s, paid sick leave was gradually introduced into federal awards until 10 days sick leave per year (with unused days rolling over into future years) became standard.

In 1941 the Curtin government passed the Pharmaceutical Benefits Act, however it was struck down as unconstitutional by the High Court in 1945.

Another Curtin government action in 1941 was the beginning of the "Vocational Training Scheme for Invalid Pensioners". This provided occupational therapy and allied services to people who were not permanently incapacitated, to help them gain employment. In 1948, this body became the Commonwealth Rehabilitation Service, and its work continued.

Under the Chifley government Hospital Benefits Act 1945, participating states and territories provided public hospital ward treatment free of charge. Non-public ward treatment for people with health insurance was subsidised by the Commonwealth. This led to an increase in the number of Australians covered by private health insurance plans.

Then from 1946, Queensland's Cooper government introduced free public hospital treatment in that state. This was retained by future Queensland governments.

A 1946 referendum changed the constitution so that the federal government could more clearly fund a range of social services including "pharmaceutical, sickness and hospital benefits, medical and dental services."

And so in 1948, the establishment of the Pharmaceutical Benefits Scheme (PBS) expanded the earlier ex-soldier only scheme to all Australians. The Labor government who introduced this had hoped to introduce further national healthcare measures like those of Britain's National Health Service, however they were voted out of office in 1949, before they had sufficient Senate support to pass the legislation. The incoming Menzies government wound back the PBS, with it continuing in a more limited form than originally planned.

In 1950, the Menzies government established the Pensioner Medical Service, providing free GP services and medicines for pensioners (including widows) and their dependants. (This was enabled by the Social Services Consolidation Act (No 2) 1948).

The National Health Act 1953 reformed the health insurance industry and the way hospitals received federal funding. Health Minister, Dr Earle Page, said that these changes would "provide an effective bulwark against the socialisation of medicine." The federal government began to offer some subsidy for all private health insurance funded services. The very poor received free health care. In 1953, private health insurance covered all but 17% of Australians. By 1969, 30% of all private health insurance costs were being paid by the federal government. While the creators of the 1953 scheme had intended that the subsidised private health insurance would fund 90% of health costs, it only covered between 65-70% between 1953 and 1969.

In 1969, the Commonwealth Committee of Inquiry into Health Insurance (the "Nimmo Enquiry") recommended a new national health scheme. The Gorton government under Health Minister, Dr Jim Forbes, provided free private health insurance for the unemployed, seriously ill workers (on sickness benefit), the severely disabled (on special benefit), new migrants, and households on a single minimum wage. In September 1969 the National Health Act was amended, and the scheme came into effect on 1 January 1970.

In 1972, 17% of Australians outside of Queensland had no health insurance, most of whom were on low incomes.

Medibank (1975–1976)
The Whitlam government, elected in 1972, sought to put an end to the three-tier system by extending healthcare coverage to the entire population. Before the Labor Party came to office, Bill Hayden, the Minister for Social Security, took the main responsibility for developing the preliminary plans to establish a universal health scheme.

According to a speech to Parliament on 29 November 1973 by Mr Hayden, the purpose of Medibank was to establish the "most equitable and efficient means of providing health insurance coverage for all Australians."

The Medibank legislation was one of the bills which led to a double dissolution on 11 April 1974, and was later passed by a joint sitting on 7 August 1974. Parliamentarians planned for Medicare to be funded by a 1.35% income tax (exempting people on a low income). However, this was rejected by the Senate, so it was instead funded from consolidated revenue.

Medibank started on 1 July 1975. In nine months, the Health Insurance Commission (HIC) had increased its staff from 22 to 3500, opened 81 offices, installed 31 minicomputers, 633 terminals and 10 medium-sized computers linked by land-lines to the central computer, and issued registered health insurance cards to 90% of the Australian population.

Medibank Mark II (1976–1981)
After a change of government at the December 1975 election, the Fraser government established the Medibank Review Committee in January 1976. This led to legislative changes, and the launch of 'Medibank Mark II' on 1 October 1976. It included a 2.5% income levy, with taxpayers having an option of instead taking out private health insurance. Other changes included reducing rebates to doctors and hospitals. Over the following years, universal free hospital access ceased in almost all hospitals, with only the poor receiving free access.

Also that year, the Fraser government passed the Medibank Private bill, which allowed the HIC to enter the private health insurance business. It was to become the dominant player in that market.

In 1978, bulk billing was restricted to pensioners and the socially disadvantaged. Rebates were reduced to 75% of the schedule fee. The health insurance levy was also scrapped that year.

In 1979, Medibank rebates were cut further. In 1981, access to Medibank was restricted further, and an income tax rebate was introduced for holders of private health insurance to encourage its uptake.

Finally, the original Medibank was dissolved entirely in late 1981, leaving behind Medibank Private.

Medicare (1984–current)
On 1 February 1984, the original Medibank model was reinstated by the Hawke government, but renamed Medicare to distinguish it from Medibank Private which continued to exist.

National Diabetes Services Scheme (NDSS) 
Funded by the Australian Government outside of the PBS and Medicare, from 1987 the National Diabetes Services Scheme has delivered diabetes-related products at affordable prices and provides information and support services. It is run by Diabetes Australia.

Coordinated Care Trials 
In 1995, the Keating government initiated experiments to find more economically efficient ways of delivering health services. This took the form of Coordinated Care Trials held from 1997 to 1999. They funded a care coordinator for around 16,000 individuals with complex health needs. The trials found that few cohorts benefited from this form of care.

Further trials were held in 2002 to 2005. They found that people with particularly complex needs could be more effectively treated with coordinated care.

Medicare Levy Surcharge, Private Health Insurance Incentive Scheme, and Lifetime Health Cover (LHC)

In 1997, the Howard government implemented a higher level of Medicare levy for high income earners. They could avoid paying this levy if they took out private health insurance. From the start of 1999, a 30 per cent rebate on the cost of private health insurance became available to further encourage people to take out private health insurance. From 2000, the "Lifetime Health Cover" policy came into effect, with private health insurance companies now charging higher premiums for people who had not taken out a policy before their 30th birthday.

Easyclaim and successors 
Easyclaim was launched in 2006, under which a patient would pay the medical practitioner the consultation fee and the receptionist would send a message to Medicare to release the amount of rebate due to the patient's designated bank account. The rebate amount would take into account the patient's concession status and thresholds. In effect, the patient only pays the gap. In recent years, this has largely been replaced with the National Australia Bank service HICAPS (Health Insurance Claim at Point of Sale). For providers not using HICAPS, patients can make claims on-the-spot (where Medicare will pay the patient at a later date), online, through the Medicare mobile apps, or at joint Medicare-Centrelink Service Centres.

Services like these have greatly reduced the need for people to visit Medicare service centres, all of which have been merged into Centrelink or myGov shopfronts.

Better Access Scheme
The Better Access Scheme extends Medicare to cover more allied health services than it did previously, especially in the area of mental health. It became available in November 2006.

Diabetes Care Project 
From 2011 to 2014, the Diabetes Care Project trailed a coordinated care model that was similar to those used in the earlier Coordinated Care Trials. It was  found that this model provided health benefits to those involved, however the cost of care was not significantly different.

National Disability Insurance Scheme (NDIS)
A long-standing criticism of the Medicare schedule was its limited coverage of services to improve the lives of people with disability. This was addressed when the 2013 Australian federal budget (ALP) established the National Disability Insurance Scheme, which was progressively rolled out across the country between 2013 and 2020. It provides funding for health services beyond those in the Medicare schedule, and is administered by the National Disability Insurance Agency, an independent government agency.

Medicare Benefits Schedule indexation freeze
In the 2013–14 federal budget, the Labor party introduced a freeze on the Medicare Benefits Schedule's indexation which aimed to continually align the amount covered by Medicare with the realistic costs of the service. Originally intended to only last a year until July 2014, the newly-elected Abbott government reimposed the freeze through 201415. Successive Coalition governments continued indexation freezes until July 2020. Between 2013 and 2020, the indexation freeze reduced the cost of the Medicare scheme by a total of $3.9 billion.

In the 2017–18 federal budget, the Turnbull government began to re-fund indexation by providing $1 billion to index GP items from July 2017, specialist consultation items from July 2018, specialist procedures and allied health from July 2019, and diagnostic imaging from July 2020. On 25 March 2018, the Labor Party announced that, if elected, it would remove all remaining indexation freezes, noting how the Morrison government's continued indexation freezes were leaving "families paying higher out-of-pocket costs to visit the doctor."

As costs for health care services increased, bulk billing rates continued to increase for a short period, before declining from mid-2015. Simultaneously, the out-of-pocket difference between the Medicare contribution and the actual cost increased by almost 10 per cent in the same period. The New South Wales branch of the Australian Medical Association (AMA NSW) took aim at federal Minister for Health Greg Hunt when he suggested that GPs had been "transformed" by a $0.55 increase to the Medicare contribution for a standard consult. In their response to Hunt's claims, the NSW AMA outlined how many GPs had been forced to limit bulk billing to cover the increasing costs, and that the increasing out-of-pocket costs were leaving some patients to seek treatment from public hospitals or not seek medical attention at all.

"Mediscare"
Towards the end of the campaign for the 2016 Australian federal election, a text claiming to be from "Medicare" was sent to certain electorates around the nation, saying "Mr Turnbull's plans to privatise Medicare will take us down the road of no return. Time is running out to Save Medicare." Leader of the Liberal Party, Malcolm Turnbull, had not announced such plans, and the Department of Human Services denied sending the message. It had instead been sent by the Queensland branch of the Australian Labor Party. The furore over the text brought attention to the value of Medicare to Australians. The affair was widely dubbed "Mediscare," which in turn was used to describe fears of the Liberal National Party's alleged devolution of Medicare.

Health Care Homes 
9000 patients were involved in the Health Care Homes trial held from 2017 to 2021. The "Homes" were medical practices, who were funded to produce health care plans for individual patients with complex needs. The trials did not improve patient outcomes, and did not decrease treatment costs.

Funding of the scheme

Medicare levy
Medicare is presently nominally funded by an income tax surcharge, known as the Medicare levy, which is currently 2% of a resident taxpayer's taxable income. However, revenue raised by the levy falls far short of funding the entirety of Medicare expenditure, and any shortfall is paid out of general government expenditure.

The 2013 budget increased the Medicare levy from 1.5% to 2% from 1 July 2014, ostensibly to fund the National Disability Insurance Scheme. The 2017 budget proposed to increase the Medicare levy from 2% to 2.5%, from 1 July 2018, but this proposal was scrapped on 25 April 2018.

When the levy is payable, it is calculated on the whole of an individual's taxable income, and not just the amount above the low-income threshold.

Low income exemptions 
Low income earners are exempt from the Medicare levy, with different exemption thresholds applying to singles, families, seniors and pensioners, with a phasing-in range. Since 2015–16, the exemptions have applied to taxable incomes below $21,335, or $33,738 for seniors and pensioners. The phasing-in range is for taxable incomes between $21,335 and $26,668, or $33,738 and $42,172 for seniors and pensioners.

Eligibility
The following groups of people have access to fully-covered health care in public hospitals via the Medicare system:
 Australian citizens
 New Zealand citizens who have lived in Australia for six months or more over the previous year
 Permanent residents
 People who have applied for permanent residence
 Temporary residents covered by a ministerial order
 Citizens or permanent residents of:
Norfolk Island
Cocos (Keeling) Islands
Christmas Island
Lord Howe Island

Reciprocal agreements
International visitors from 11 countries have subsidised access to medically necessary treatment under reciprocal agreements. Reciprocal Health Care Agreements (RHCA) are in place with the United Kingdom, Sweden, the Netherlands, Belgium, Finland, Norway, Slovenia, Malta, Italy, Republic of Ireland, and New Zealand, which entitles visitors from these countries limited access to public health care in Australia (often only for emergencies and critical care), and entitles eligible Australians to reciprocal rights while in one of these countries.

Exclusions
Asylum seekers in Australia who have applied for a protection visa and whose bridging visa had expired have no access to services like Medicare, and no Centrelink payments or other social services, and are not allowed to work. It was estimated in July 2022 that there were around 2000 people in this situation.

Australian prisoners, including children in juvenile detention, have never had access to Medicare. Prisoners within correction facilities are able to access no-cost health services which are paid for by the respective state or territory health department. The level of care available, however, is far below the level given to people with Medicare, and many health services and medications are not available in prison at all as it is considered too expensive to pay for them without Medicare rebates.

Medicare rebates or benefits

Medicare Benefits Schedule
Medicare sets a schedule of fees for medical services, called the Medicare Benefits Schedule (MBS), which is freely accessible online. The schedule fee is the government's standard cost of a particular medical service. The Australian Medical Association (the doctors' union) maintains a similar schedule called the AMA List of Medical Services and Fees (AMA Fees List), which provides members with "costing assistance and guidance". It represents the "market rate" for services.

Service providers can charge consumers whatever fee they wish, which is often lower than the schedule fee for low income clients, and higher than the schedule fee for everyone else. In 2010, an OECD study found that Australia was the only one of the 29 countries studied to give service providers this freedom.

At its inception, the MBS was the same as the AMA's equivalent. However, the government has allowed a large gap to grow between the MBS fees and what is charged in the market, in part by freezing indexation of the schedule fees for specialists from 2012 to 2020, and GPs from 2014 to 2020. In 2018 it was suggested that MBS schedule fees were now approximately 45% of the AMA list fees. In 2019, the AMA produced a poster suggesting that if the MBS schedule fees had increased by the same amount as their members' costs, they would more than three times what they currently were.

In 2017 the AMA stated: "Indexation of the MBS and the private schedules have not kept pace with the costs of providing medical care. This is why patients may have out-of-pocket costs for medical services. The AMA List is indexed annually at a rate that takes account of the cost of providing medical services and is therefore higher than the MBS and private schedules. The AMA List guides members in setting their fees with periodic indexation."

Additionally, each private health insurer has their own independently maintained fee schedule for medical services.

Standard rebate
The standard Medicare rebate or benefit is 100% of a general practitioner, 85% of a specialist and 75% of private hospital Medicare schedule fee. Where medical practitioners bill Medicare directly (called "bulk billing"), they agree with Medicare to accept their proportion of the schedule fee as full payment for their services. Many medical practitioners bulk bill pensioner patients, and some bulk bill other groups or all of their patients.

The growing gap between the market rate and the MBS schedule fee for services has resulted in some practitioners opting out of bulk billing, with affected patients having to pay out-of-pocket costs.

Allied services
Some specialties and allied health services are at least partly covered by Medicare, limited to those patients with a chronic illness whose GP has created a "general practitioner management plan" or "team care arrangements" for them. Services such as ophthalmology, physiotherapy, podiatry and audiology (especially though Hearing Australia) are covered, while others such as (most) dental services are not. For Australians struggling with mental health, Medicare provides up to 10 fully covered individual and group counselling sessions per year as part of the Better Access Scheme. To access these, patients need to create a "mental health care plan" with their GP. The Better Access Scheme also covers the cost of other mental health care, including from occupational therapists, social workers, general practitioners and psychiatrists.

Out-of-pocket costs
The difference between the cost of health care and the rebate is called an out-of-pocket cost or co-payment. The out-of-pocket costs for Australians are continuing to increase, as a result of increases in healthcare costs above Medicare schedule increases, and also because a Medicare benefits freeze has been imposed over the last few years. Medical practitioners choosing to cease or cut back on bulk-billing also increases out-of-pocket costs to patients.

If a practitioner does not bulk bill a particular patient, that patient will receive a bill for the medical expenses and is obligated to pay the bill. The practitioner is paid the full amount of the bill. The patient is reimbursed by Medicare 85% of the schedule fee and is out-of-pocket for the balance of the bill. Medicare accumulates the gap amounts, which is the difference between the schedule fee and the 85% reimbursed by Medicare, paid by the patient, to determine when the safety net threshold is reached. After the threshold is reached, the patient is reimbursed for the balance of the schedule fee (i.e., 15%). In the three months to July 2016, 85.9% of GP visits were bulk billed, which fell to 85.4% in the three months to September 2016.

Many medical practitioners charge more than the schedule fee, and the amount in excess of the schedule fee must be borne by the patient and is not counted towards the safety net threshold.

Safety nets
To provide additional relief to those who incur higher than usual medical costs, Medicare safety nets have been set up. These provide singles and families with an additional rebate when an annual threshold is reached for out-of-hospital Medicare services. A basic safety net exists for all Australians, with an extended safety net for some families.

The thresholds for both safety nets are indexed on 1 January each year to the Consumer Price Index.

General safety net
Under the original Medicare safety net, once an annual threshold in gap costs has been reached, the Medicare rebate for out-of-hospital services is increased to 100% of the schedule fee (up from 85%).  Gap costs refer to the difference between the standard Medicare rebate (85% of the schedule fee) and the actual fee paid, but limited to 100% of the schedule fee. The threshold applies for all Medicare cardholders and is $531.70 for 2023.

Extended safety net
The extended Medicare safety net was first introduced in March 2004. Once an annual threshold in out-of-pocket costs for out-of-hospital Medicare services is reached, the Medicare rebate will increase to 80% of any future out-of-pocket costs (now subject to the extended safety net fee cap) for out-of-hospital Medicare services for the remainder of the calendar year. Out-of-pocket costs are the difference between the fee actually paid to the practitioner (subject to the fee cap) and the standard Medicare rebate.

When introduced, the general threshold for singles and families was $700, or $300 for singles and families that hold a concession card and families that received Family Tax Benefit Part A. On 1 January 2006, the thresholds were increased to $1,000 and $500 respectively. From then the extended safety net was indexed by the Consumer Price Index on 1 January each year.

Since 1 January 2010, some medical fees have been subject to an safety net fee cap, so that the out-of-pocket costs used in determining whether the threshold has been reached are limited to that cap. The extended safety net fee cap also applies for any rebate that is paid once the EMSN threshold is reached. The items subject to a cap has expanded since 2010, the latest being in November 2012.

Operation of the scheme

Services Australia
Services Australia (previously the Department of Human Services) is the statutory agency responsible for operating the Medicare scheme. Medicare Australia was the responsible agency for the scheme until it was dissolved in 2011 into the Department of Human Services. Currently, Services Australia operates the scheme in consultation with the national Department of Health and other health-related agencies such as the Australian Organ Donor Register and state health services (for example, Queensland Health).

Medicare provider numbers
Medicare issues to eligible health professionals a unique Medicare provider number to enable them to participate in the Medicare scheme. The provider number is required to appear on the practitioners' bills, prescriptions or service requests (referrals) that are eligible for a Medicare benefit. A practitioner may have more than one number, if, for example, they practise from more than one location.

Medicare card

Medicare issues each person entitled to receive benefits under the scheme with a Medicare card which has a number that must be used when making a claim. In addition to the physical card, a nationality accepted digital version is accessible in the Medicare Express smartphone app. 

Either must be produced or the Medicare number provided if the Medicare rebate is paid directly to the doctor under the bulk billing system; and in its absence the doctor cannot bulk bill for the consultation. The doctor is permitted to keep a record of the patient's card number and use it at subsequent visits.

It is also necessary to provide a card number (although not necessarily show the card) to gain access to the public hospital system to be treated as a public patient. For non-elective treatment (e.g. emergency), public hospitals will admit patients without a number or card and resolve Medicare eligibility issues after treatment.

The Medicare card will also be required when accessing medical, hospital or pharmaceutical services in a country with which Australia has a reciprocal health care agreement.

See also

 Health care in Australia
 Medicare card, on the card itself
 Medicare (Canada)
 Medicare (United States)
 National Health Service
 Healthdirect Australia

References

Citations

Sources 

 Medicare – Background Brief
 Medibank: from conception to delivery and beyond

External links
 Medicare (Australia) Official website
 Department of Health and Ageing Bulk Billing Rates
 APH Background Brief on Medicare (to 2004)
 Medicare Benefits Schedule Online 
 Department of Health and Ageing – Overseas Visitors' Health Cover
 What is Medicare in Australia?
 Making Medicare: The Politics of Universal Health Care in Australia
 The Making of Medibank
 Before Bob Hawke's Medicare, a visit to hospital forced many Australians into bankruptcy
 Medicare: The making and consolidation of an Australian institution
 Medicare ephemera material collected by the National Library of Australia
 Adventures in Health Risk

Public policy in Australia
 
Government agencies established in 1975
Publicly funded health care